Cylindrocarpon candidum is a fungal plant pathogen that causes cankers on elm.

References

External links 
 Index Fungorum
 USDA ARS Fungal Database

Fungal tree pathogens and diseases
Nectriaceae
Fungi described in 1926